A Deadly Shade of Gold (1965) is the fifth novel in the Travis McGee series by John D. MacDonald. The plot revolves around a solid gold Aztec statuette, and takes McGee from his home of Florida to Mexico and Los Angeles.  The cover bills this novel as a "double-length adventure" and is about twice as many pages as the previous Travis McGee novels.

References
 
 

1965 American novels
Travis McGee (novel series)